Christina Elizabeth Kramer is Professor of Slavic and Balkan languages and linguistics at the University of Toronto and Chair of the university's Department of Slavic Languages and Literatures which is part of the Faculty of Arts and Science.

Education and career
 1975: B.A. (Russian and comparative literature), Beloit College, Beloit, Wisconsin
 1980: M.A. (Slavic Languages and Literatures), University of North Carolina at Chapel Hill
 1983: Ph.D., University of North Carolina at Chapel Hill

Kramer worked as a translator for Berlitz Translation Service for some time, translating documents from Bulgarian, Macedonian, Russian, Serbo-Croatian, and Turkish.

Since 1986 Kramer has been a member of the University of Toronto faculty. She was promoted to full professor in May 2001.

Scholarly work 
Kramer is a specialist on Balkan languages and semantics, specifically on South Slavic languages. Her research focus on synchronic linguistics, sociolinguistics, verbal categories, language and politics.

Kramer authored Macedonian: A Course for Beginning and Intermediate Students. The book – first published in 1999, revised and expanded in 2003 and 2011 – is the most recent English-Macedonian textbook. She is a noted translator of literature from Bulgarian and Macedonian, receiving a Literature Translation Fellowship from the NEA in 2018.

Kramer co-invented the language "Lavinian" for Nicolas Billon's play Butcher.

Key publications
 Christina E. Kramer (2003): Macedonian (= Makedonski jazik): A Course for Beginning and Intermediate Students.  Revised and expanded third edition. University of Wisconsin Press. September 2011. 
 Christina E. Kramer/Brian Cook (1999): Guard the Word Well Bound: Proceedings of the Third North American-Macedonian Conference on Macedonian Studies. Slavica Pub: Indiana Slavic Papers, vol. 10 (1999). 
 Eran Fraenkel (Author), Christina Kramer (Editor) (1993): Language Contact-Language Conflict (Balkan Studies). Peter Lang Publishing. 
 Christina E. Kramer (1986): Analytic Modality in Macedonian. (Slavistische Beiträge) Munich: Verlag Otto Sagner. 
 Christina Kramer (1985): Makedonsko-Angliski Razgovornik. Skopje: Seminar za makedonksi jazik.

Translations
Christina E. Kramer's translations of several Bulgarian and Macedonian novels (by Luan Starova, Goce Smilevski, Lidija Dimkovska, and Aleko Konstantinov) have been published by the University of Wisconsin Press and Penguin Books.

Awards
Kramer received the 2006 Book Award from the American Association of Teachers of Slavic and Eastern European Languages for best contribution to language pedagogy for her book Macedonian: A Course for Beginning and Intermediate Students.

In 2014, Kramer was awarded a National Endowment for the Arts grant to fund her work on translating a novel from Luan Starova's Balkan Saga cycle, The Path of the Eels (or the Pyramid of Water). This was the first time ever a NEA grant was awarded to support a translation from Macedonian to English. Her translation of Lidija Dimkovska's "A Spare Life" made the long list for the Best Translated Book of 2017 Award.

In 2022, Kramer's translation of The Summer You Weren’t There by Petar Andonovski, from Macedonian to English, won a PEN Translates Award from English PEN.

References

External links
 Personal Website
 Macedonian: A course for beginning and intermediate students
 Interview with Christina Kramer on SBS

Linguists from Canada
Academic staff of the University of Toronto
Beloit College alumni
University of North Carolina at Chapel Hill alumni
Year of birth missing (living people)
Living people
Macedonists
Place of birth missing (living people)
Canadian people of American descent
Women linguists
Sociolinguists